Khaga is a constituency of the Uttar Pradesh Legislative Assembly covering the city of Khaga in the Fatehpur district of Uttar Pradesh, India.

Khaga is one of six assembly constituencies in the Fatehpur Lok Sabha constituency. Since 2008, this assembly constituency is numbered 243 amongst 403 constituencies.

Wards/Areas
It contains these parts of Fatehpur district-
Khaga, Vijayipur, Khakhareru(NP), Dhata(NP), Khaga (NP) & Kishunpur (NP) of Khaga Tehsil.

Elected MLAs

Election results

2022

2017

References

External links
 

Assembly constituencies of Uttar Pradesh
Fatehpur district